The following list includes stops on the Walking Tour Guide prepared by Maren Tomblin and published by the Washburne Neighborhood Association in Springfield, Oregon. Funding for the guide was provided by the Springfield Historic Commission and by the National Park Service.

The Washburne Historic District was established in 1984 and added to the National Register of Historic Places in 1987. The district includes roughly 34 blocks of working class houses constructed between the 1890s and the 1940s. The district also includes a few larger residences. Many houses are named either for the original owner or for an early resident. All of the 27 stops on the walking tour are named, and the tour includes an early store, a fire house, and a hospital.

External links
Springfield Historic Commission
Everyday Houses:A guide to Springfield's most popular house types 1880-1980
Walking Tour Guide

Washburne Historic District
Neighborhoods in Oregon
Urban heritage trails
Houses in Lane County, Oregon
Springfield, Oregon